Alfredo Joignant Rondon is a Chilean sociologist and political science professor at the Diego Portales University. He holds a Phd in political science at the Paris 1 Panthéon-Sorbonne University.  Joignant is a researcher at Centro de Estudios de Conflicto y Cohesión Social (COES), a joint venture of the University of Chile, the Pontifical Catholic University of Chile, Diego Portales University and Adolfo Ibáñez University.

Joignant is the past President of the Chilean Political Science Association. He has published in journals of international prestige such as Sociological Perspectives, Sociology Compass, Memory Studies, Democratization, Journal of Latin American Studies, Revista mexicana de sociología, Cahiers internationaux de sociologie, Politix. Revue des sciences sociales du politique, and Revue française de science politique. His last book is Acting Politics: a Critical Sociology of the Political Field (London and New York: Routledge, 2019), forthcoming in Spanish in 2022 (El juego político. Madrid: Tecnos). 

Joignant has praised the "programatic intuition" of the second government of Michelle Bachelet (2014–2018). He is the co-author (with Fernando Atria, Javier Couso, José Miguel Benavente and Guillermo Larraín) of El otro modelo. Del orden neoliberal al régimen de lo público (Santiago: Debate, 2013). Joignant has on the other side being deeply critical of Axel Kaiser's and Gloria Álvarez's book El engaño populista which he called "confuse", "harmful" and "very bad". In 2018 Joignant sparred with Daniel Jadue, a defender of the Maduro government, in televised debate over the situation in Venezuela.

In 2019 Joignant was a member of the “jury d’agrégation” in political science in France.

He is a counsellor of the Chilean Electoral Service (2018-2023), appointed by the Senate.

References

Living people
Chilean political scientists
Chilean columnists
Chilean sociologists
Year of birth missing (living people)